Mel Ottenberg (b. 1976 ) is an American wardrobe stylist and currently serves as the Editor-In-Chief of Interview Magazine. He has worked as Rihanna's stylist since 2011.  He lives and works in New York, New York.

Early life and education 
Ottenberg grew up in Washington, D.C. His father is a fourth-generation baker. His mother and stepfather were in publishing and designed magazines.

Work 
Ottenberg has worked on advertising campaigns for Dior, Nike and Tom Ford. He served as fashion director of 032c  and has collaborated with numerous photographers including Inez and Vinoodh, Mario Sorrenti, Steven Klein, Terry Richardson, Wong Kar-Wa and Collier Schorr. His work has appeared in publications like Purple, Harper's Bazaar, Dazed & Confused . GQ, and T.

He frequently works with musicians styling for: music videos (Troye Sivan's "My My My!"), album covers (Björk's Vulnicura), and award show appearances (Alicia Keys’ 2019 Grammy hosting job). He has celebrities including Selena Gomez, Lana Del Rey, Justin Bieber, Chloë Sevigny, James Franco, Cate Blanchett, and Jennifer Aniston.

Interview Magazine 
In 2018, Ottenberg was named as Interview's creative director.

Ottenberg was named Editor-In-Chief of Interview in 2021.

References 

Living people
Year of birth missing (living people)
Place of birth missing (living people)
American fashion designers
Creative directors